The 1965–66 season was SC Tasmania 1900 Berlin's first and only season in the Bundesliga, the top tier of German football. They finished 18th in the Bundesliga and were relegated to the Regionalliga Berlin, having set multiple Bundesliga records such as least points, fewest goals, most goals conceded and fewest wins. They were eliminated from the DFB-Pokal in the first round by 1. FC Köln.

Season summary
Tasmania Berlin were added to the league just two weeks before the start of the season after city rivals Hertha BSC had been thrown out on financial irregularities. They were not even first choice for a replacement as the Berlin representative, as they had only finished in third place in Regionalliga Berlin. But when champions Tennis Borussia were considered too weak after failing in the promotion play-off rounds and therefore were not asked, and runners-up Spandauer SV declined their interest in a Bundesliga spot as well, Tasmania gladly accepted the invitation by the German FA.

The decision turned out to be a fatal one for the club. Tasmania's team was never capable of competing in the Bundesliga. They set up a various number of records, including, among others, lowest point total (8), fewest wins (2), most losses (28), fewest goals scored (15), most goals against (108) and lowest match attendance for a Bundesliga game (827 against Borussia Mönchengladbach on 15 January 1966). Most of the records are still intact.

Competitions

Bundesliga

League table

Matches

DFB-Pokal

Notes

References

SC Tasmania 1900 Berlin seasons
Tasmania Berlin